Postal Codes in Albania consist of 4 digits; the first two digits show the branch on a district level located at the center of that administrative level, whereas the second two digits show the postal office offering service to a defined administration unit on a municipality level: 

 1000  District of Tirana
 1500  District of Krujë
 2000  District of Durrës
 2500  District of Kavajë
 3000  District of Elbasan
 3300  District of Gramsh
 3400  District of Librazhd
 3500  District of Peqin
 4000  District of Shkodër
 4300  District of Malësi e Madhe
 4400  District of Pukë
 4500  District of Lezhë
 4600  District of Mirditë
 4700  District of Kurbin
 5000  District of Berat
 5300  District of Kuçovë
 5400  District of Skrapar
 6000  District of Gjirokastër
 6300  District of Tepelenë
 6400  District of Përmet
 7000  District of Korçë
 7300  District of Pogradec
 7400  District of Kolonjë
 8000  District of Mat
 8300  District of Dibër
 8400  District of Bulqizë
 8500  District of Kukës
 8600  District of Has
 8700  District of Tropojë
 9000  District of Lushnjë
 9300  District of Fier
 9400  District of Vlorë
 9700  District of Sarandë
 1700  Transit
 1800  EMS Office

External links
Tirana Postal Codes Coverage Areas

Albania Postal Codes by branch

Albania
Postal system of Albania